Louis Samuel Montagu, 2nd Baron Swaythling (10 December 1869–11 June 1927) was a prominent member of the British Jewish community, a financier, and a political activist. He was the son and heir of Samuel Montagu, 1st Baron Swaythling, and of his wife Ellen (Cohen).

Life
He was educated at Clifton College, and later became head of the family banking business.

He opposed the Balfour Declaration. In 1917, along with  Lionel Nathan de Rothschild, Sir Philip Magnus and other prominent British Jews, he co-founded the anti-Zionist League of British Jews.
He was president of the Federation of Synagogues, until 1925.

In 1897 Townhill Farm was purchased for Louis by his father Samuel Montagu, who continued to live at South Stoneham House. In 1912 extensive further modifications were made to the building by the architect Leonard Rome Guthrie, who returned after the First World War to add the music room and a boudoir for Lady Swaythling.  The gardens at Townhill Park were laid out by Gertrude Jekyll and were noted for their rhododendrons, azaleas and camellias.

Family
He was married to Gladys Helen Rachel Goldsmid (1879–1965), a member of both the Goldsmid and Rothschild banking families. Lady Swaythling was active in voluntary organisations, including the Electrical Association for Women and the National Society for the Prevention of Cruelty to Children. In World War I, she supported Belgian refugees and volunteered with the Wounded Allies' Relief Committee.

They had four children:
 Stuart Albert Montagu, 3rd Baron Swaythling, and father of David Montagu, 4th Baron Swaythling.
 Ewen Montagu, lawyer, judge, and naval officer.
 Ivor Montagu,  film maker.
 Joyce Ida Jessie Montagu.

References

1869 births
1927 deaths
People educated at Clifton College
Louis
Louis
English Jews
Burials at Willesden Jewish Cemetery